Nongbua Pitchaya Football Club (Thai: สโมสรฟุตบอลหนองบัว พิชญ) is a Thai professional football club based in Nong Bua Lamphu Province. The club participates in Thai League 1, the first tier of Thai football league system.

The club was founded in Mueang Nong Bua Lam Phu District, Nong Bua Lamphu Province in 2010. They played their home matches at Nong Bua Lamphu Province Stadium. They were first entered to the Thai football league system in 2010, competes in Thai Division 2 League (North Eastern Region), the third tier of Thai football league.

In 2017 the club were first promoted to the Thai League 2, after winning 2016 Regional League Division 2.

History

The beginning and professionalism at the club
The club was formed by Sports Association of Nong Bua Lamphu Province in 2010; Watchara Leeprasert mayor of Nong Bua Lamphu became the first club chairman, Suthin Srithong was the first coach and Electricity Generating Authority of Thailand (EGAT) was the club sponsor.

The club entered Thai Division 2 League (North Eastern Region) 2010 season, third tier of Thai football league system with the name EGAT Nongbua Lamphu United and received the nickname Phu Phan Kham Thunder.

On 14 February 2010, the club played their first ever game, against Udon Thani F.C. at Institute of Physical Education Udon Thani Stadium. They win their first game 0–1 with the goal from Wutthisak Sriladlao , it make him the first player who scored for the club, and in the end of their first season they finished tenth of the table.

After the end of 2010 season Electricity Generating Authority of Thailand (EGAT) not renew a sponsorship agreement, the club changed their badge and name to Nongbua Lamphu F.C. in 2011 season and received the new nickname Electric eel.

The club have first-ever match in the Thai League Cup on 18 May 2011 and lost to Yasothon United 7–4 in first qualifying round (northeastern region), in the league they finished twelfth on the table.

In 2012 season they have a financial problems and not have a sponsorship but still finished twelfth again, during the 2013 season, a dismal run of form saw the team go down to the bottom of the league table with only 24 points from 30 games, they lost 14 games, won only 4 games and finished fifteenth on the table. Because of a lack of liquidity the club was forced to search for new owners.

During the 2014 season Suthep Poomongkolsuriya, owner of Pitchayabundit College, a private university in Nong Bua Lamphu completed his takeover of the club, and the club finished twelfth in 2014 season.

2015–present –  First title and the Pitchaya stadium
In 2015 season the club changed their badge and name to Nongbua Pitchaya F.C., the new chairman made the club more liquid and gave more transfer-wage budgets. The club had their first-ever match in the Thai FA Cup on 24 June 2015; in the second round and they drew against Kamphaengphet F.C. 1–1, before losing in a penalty shoot-out. In the league they finished eighth in Division 2 northeastern region.

In 2016 season the club relocated from the northeastern to the northern region and qualify to the second round in Thai League Cup and Thai FA Cup , the club made a good performance in northern region including a 5–0 win over Phetchabun F.C. and lost only 3 games. They qualified to Division 2 Champions League round as winner of northern region zone.

In the Champions League round they qualified to semi-final, but following the death of King Bhumibol Adulyadej the Football Association of Thailand cancelled the remaining match on 14 October 2016. To find 3 of 4 teams to promoted to Thai League 2 made by draw lots, and the club was promoted after the drawing of lots with Kasetsart F.C. and Trat F.C.

The Gamecocks continued to grow as a sports club and also began acquiring more assets. Nongbua Pitchaya's first football stadium started construction in 2019 and started to be used for the Thai League 2 in 2020.

Nongbua won the M150 Championship in March 2021, earning them promotion to Thai League 1 for the first time in their history.

Academies
Nongbua Pitchaya opened its first academies in 2016. The club is one of the leading youth football development academies in Northeast Thailand same level as Buriram United academies – The club's youth team Under-13 and Under-15 are the Northeastern Upper reginal winners of Thailand Youth League in 2017-18 and 2018-19 season. The club also sends youth teams to compete in the country's major youth football events, such as the cp-meiji cup held in Buriram province.  The club's youth team performed well in CP-meiji Cup U-14 International Champions, in 2018 semi-final round beat Aspire Academy. The achievements in the development of the youth academy of Nongbua Pitchaya in the country causing football players to join the Thai national youth team such as Thawatchai Aocharod.

The Academy coaches are supported by the club to send professional coaching lessons according to the Asian Football Confederation curriculum to develop the potential of the instructors to acquire knowledge subjects under the concept of Pitchaya academies by playing developed under the name "Nong Bua Lona" style that focuses on - agility, movement, effective passing of the ball. In 2019, the Academy of Nong Bua Pichaya has more than 200 children, divided into 9 generations according to age (11–19 years), whose production begins to bloom in the third year of the academy.

Affiliated clubs

 Shonan Bellmare (2022–present)
Nongbua Pitchaya have entered a ground breaking alliance with Japanese club Shonan Bellmare in 2022. This agreement to be of benefit to both clubs through the exchange of young players and coaching staff, shared knowledge on technical–training methods and playing friendly matches together. 

Nongbua Pitchaya youth teams was invited to join the competition "Copa Belmare International tournament" held in Japan that Shonan Bellmare hold this tournament every year.

Stadium and locations
Nongbua Pitchaya's first football stadium was built in 2019 was called Pitchaya stadium.

Season-by-season record

P = Played
W = Games won
D = Games drawn
L = Games lost
F = Goals for
A = Goals against
Pts = Points
Pos = Final position

QR1 = First Qualifying Round
QR2 = Second Qualifying Round
R1 = Round 1
R2 = Round 2
R3 = Round 3
R4 = Round 4

R5 = Round 5
R6 = Round 6
QF = Quarter-finals
SF = Semi-finals
RU = Runners-up
W = Winners

Season by season record for team U-23

Current squad

Club Staff

List of Head Coaches

Honours

Domestic leagues
Thai League 2:
Winner: 2020–21
Regional League Northern Division
 Winner : 2016

References

External links
 Official Website of Nongbua Pitchaya F.C.
 

 
Association football clubs established in 2010
Football clubs in Thailand
Nong Bua Lamphu province
2010 establishments in Thailand